Juína is a municipality in the state of Mato Grosso in the Central-West Region of Brazil.

The municipality contains the Iquê Ecological Station.
It is served by Juína Airport.

See also
List of municipalities in Mato Grosso

References

Municipalities in Mato Grosso